The 2014–15 Meralco Bolts season was the 5th season of the franchise in the Philippine Basketball Association (PBA).

Key dates
July 9: Talk 'N Text Tropang Texters head coach Norman Black was moved to the Meralco Bolts, replacing Ryan Gregorio as head coach.
July 26: Former Alaska Aces coach Luigi Trillo was hired as assistant coach of the team.
August 24: The 2014 PBA Draft will take place in Midtown Atrium, Robinson Place Manila.

Draft picks

Roster

Philippine Cup

Eliminations

Standings

Game log

Playoffs

Bracket

Commissioner's Cup

Eliminations

Standings

Game log

Playoffs

Bracket

Transactions

Trades

Pre-season

Recruited imports

(* Asian import)

References

Meralco Bolts seasons
Meralco